Roman Valeš (born 6 March 1990 in Nymburk) is a Czech footballer, who currently plays for Bohemians 1905 as a goalkeeper. He has represented his country at youth international level.

References

External links
 
 

1990 births
Living people
People from Nymburk
Czech footballers
Czech Republic youth international footballers
Czech Republic under-21 international footballers
Association football goalkeepers
Czech First League players
FK Jablonec players
Sportspeople from the Central Bohemian Region